is a 2011 Japanese drama film directed by Tatsushi Ōmori, based on a 2006 novel by Shion Miura. It rotates around a down-on-his-luck handyman who reunites with an old friend from his middle school days, who winds up joining his business.

A sequel television series based on the sequel book, also starring Eita and Matsuda, aired in 2013 on TV Tokyo. A second film based on the third book in the series premiered in 2014.

Cast
 Eita as Keisuke Tada
 Ryuhei Matsuda as Haruhiko Gyōten
 Tasuku Emoto as Yamashita
 Manami Honjō as Nagiko Sanmine
 Reiko Kataoka as Lulu
 Ittoku Kishibe as Hayasaka
 Kengo Kora as Hoshi
 Akaji Maro as Oka
 Suzuki Matsuo as Shinchan
 Masaki Miura
 Yuko Nakamura as Mari's mother
 Nao Ōmori as Yamada

References

External links
 

2011 films
2011 drama films
Japanese drama films
2010s Japanese-language films
Films directed by Tatsushi Ōmori
2010s Japanese films